Jonas Björkman and Todd Woodbridge were the defending champions, but lost in the second round to Tomáš Cibulec and Daniel Vacek.

Mark Knowles and Daniel Nestor defeated Michaël Llodra and Fabrice Santoro 7–6(4), 6–3 in the final to win the men's doubles title.

Seeds

Draw

Finals

Top half

Section 2

Bottom half

Section 3

Section 4

External links
 2002 Australian Open – Men's draws and results at the International Tennis Federation
 Draw

Men's Doubles
Australian Open (tennis) by year – Men's doubles